The Grand Hôtel Bellevue is a grand hotel designed in eclecticism style by Octave van Rysselberghe in Westende, West Flanders, Belgium.

In 1984, the facades and roofs of the building were protected as a monument, followed by the interior in 1996. In the fall of 1997, a two-year renovation was started.

References

External links
 

Hotels in Belgium
West Flanders
Octave van Rysselberghe buildings
Houses completed in 1911